Sport minore is a 1951 Italian  documentary film directed by Francesco Maselli.

External links

1951 films
1950s Italian-language films
Films directed by Francesco Maselli
Italian documentary films
1951 documentary films
Italian black-and-white films
1950s Italian films